The Myakkahatchee Creek is a small stream located near the city of North Port  in Sarasota County, Florida.  It is a tributary of the Myakka River.

References

External links
 Myakkahatchee Creek Environmental Park, City of North Port
 Myakkahatchee Creek Environmental Park PDF  City of North Port

Rivers of Florida
Rivers of Sarasota County, Florida